Ballintubber, officially Ballintober, is a village in County Mayo, Ireland, known for Ballintubber Abbey which was founded in 1216. The countryside of Ballintubber is set against the against the backdrop of the Partry Mountains.

History
The long history of Ballintubber dates back to pre-Christian times, when people came from the east, through Ballintubber, on the way to a druidic site now called Croagh Patrick. When Saint Patrick brought Christianity to the west of Ireland after 461 A.D., he founded a church at Ballintubber. The present Ballintubber Abbey was founded in 1216 by Cathal Crobhdearg, Chief of the Name of Clan O'Conor and King of Connacht. Church records for Ballintubber and Burriscarra parish commenced in 1839 and are held at the South Mayo Family Research Centre in Ballinrobe.

Notable people
Alan Dillon, politician
Cillian O'Connor, footballer
Diarmuid O'Connor, footballer
Sean na Sagart, priest

See also
 List of towns and villages in Ireland

References

External links
 Ballintubber GAA Club

Towns and villages in County Mayo